Eldon Fortie (May 21, 1941 – January 6, 2021) was an American professional football player for the Edmonton Eskimos in the Canadian Football League (CFL). He played college football for the BYU Cougars. Dubbed "The Phantom" while at BYU, he was the first BYU football player to be named to a first-team All-America squad.

Biography 

Fortie was born in Salt Lake City, Utah. During his senior season at Brigham Young University, Fortie led the nation in total offense for eight weeks, and at the end of the season finished second behind Terry Baker with 1,963 total yards and 14 touchdowns. On September 29, 1962, Fortie ran for 272 yards in a single game in Provo against the George Washington University Colonials.  That was the single best running game of any BYU player in school history, until 2016, when Jamaal Williams rushed for 286 yards against Toledo. Fortie's No. 40 was retired after that season, the first BYU student to have that honor. In 1962, he ran for 1,149 yards and 14 TDs but more impressively also threw for 814 yards with 7 TDs. He finished 10th in the Heisman voting.

Although Fortie was a quarterback, BYU ran the single wing offense at the time; consequently, Fortie was primarily a running back. He was selected to play in several all-star games after the 1962 season, including the North-South Bowl in Miami, the Hula Bowl, the All-American Game in Tucson, and the Coaches All-American Bowl.

After graduation, Fortie played one year in the CFL with the Edmonton Eskimos. He died in Mesa, Arizona, on January 6, 2021, at the age of 79.

References

1941 births
2021 deaths
American football quarterbacks
American football running backs
American players of Canadian football
BYU Cougars football players
Edmonton Elks players
Players of American football from Salt Lake City
Sportspeople from Provo, Utah
Sportspeople from Salt Lake City